Norris Conradi (25 August 1890 – 30 July 1928) was a New Zealand cricketer. He played ten first-class matches for Otago between 1917 and 1926.

Conradi was born at Melbourne in Australia in 1890. He worked as a commercial traveller and died at Dunedin in 1928.

References

External links
 

1890 births
1928 deaths
New Zealand cricketers
Otago cricketers
Cricketers from Melbourne